Puteri Indonesia 2022, the 25th Puteri Indonesia pageant, was held on 27 May 2022 at Jakarta Convention Center in Jakarta, Indonesia. Puteri Indonesia 2020, Raden Roro Ayu Maulida Putri of East Java crowned her successor, Laksmi Shari De-Neefe Suardana of Bali at the end of the event. She represented Indonesia at Miss Universe 2022. Puteri Indonesia Lingkungan 2020, Putu Ayu Saraswati of Bali and Puteri Indonesia Pariwisata 2020, Jihane Almira Chedid of Central Java also crowned their successors, Cindy May McGuire of Jakarta SCR 5 and Adinda Cresheilla of East Java. Cresheilla represented the country at Miss Supranational 2022 where she placed 3rd runner-up, while McGuire competed at Miss International 2022 but unplaced.

The finale was attended by Miss Universe 2021, Harnaaz Sandhu of India and Miss International 2019, Sireethorn Leearamwat of Thailand. Miss Supranational 2021, Chanique Rabe of Namibia was replaced by her first runner-up, Karla Guilfu of Puerto Rico, since she was not able to attend the show.

Background

Location and date 
Puteri Indonesia 2022 was originally scheduled to be held on 18 March 2022. However, on 17 February, Yayasan Puteri Indonesia postponed the show due to the rising COVID-19 cases amidst the spread of the Omicron variant. It was finally held on 27 May at the Plenary Hall, Jakarta Convention Center, Jakarta.

Host and performers 
Choky Sitohang and Patricia Gunawan returned to host Puteri Indonesia 2022. This was Sitohang's eleventh and Gunawan's second time to host the pageant; they previously hosted the 2020 edition together. Bubah Alfian and Anastasia Praditha served as the backstage hosts. Bunga Citra Lestari, Mawar Eva de Jongh, and Vidi Aldiano performed.

Selection of participants 
10 contestants were chosen from the regional competition held in their respective provinces. They were South Sumatra, West Java, Central Java, SR Yogyakarta, East Java, West Nusa Tenggara, West Kalimantan, South Sulawesi 1, Southeast Sulawesi, and North Maluku. 29 contestants were selected by judges through an audition held in Jakarta and the rest six by audiences through public voting. On 9 May 2022, Jazmine Callista Rowe of Bali 2 withdrew before the pre-quarantine started due to unknown reason. In total, 44 contestants competed for the title, making it the biggest turnout for Puteri Indonesia to date. This edition also marked the first time that other provinces than Jakarta SCR had more than one representative.

Results

Main
 Puteri Indonesia 2022 
 Puteri Indonesia Lingkungan 2022
 Puteri Indonesia Pariwisata 2022

Δ Voted into the Top 6 by viewers
§ Voted into the Top 11 by viewers

Special awards

Pageant

Format

Puteri Indonesia Favorit Daerah 

All 34 provinces had one favorite delegate decided from the highest public vote. The winner competed against other favorite delegates from their regions to be one of Puteri Indonesia 2022 contestants.

∆ Withdrew before voting started§ Won the public vote

Puteri Indonesia Favorit Kepulauan 

Instead of the previous 39, there will be 44 contestants competing for Puteri Indonesia 2022 title. Each regional group (Sumatra, Java, Lesser Sunda Islands,  Kalimantan, Sulawesi, and Eastern Indonesia) had one extra representative decided from the highest public vote.

∆ Withdrew before the pre-quarantine started

Pre-quarantine 

The pre-quarantine of Puteri Indonesia 2022 was held from 11 May to 17 May 2022. Many activities, such as contestants introduction, sashing ceremony, makeup class, catwalk class, official photoshoot and videoshoot, choreography practice, and COVID-19 test, were done during this period of time.

Quarantine 

The quarantine of Puteri Indonesia 2022 was held from 18 May to 26 May 2022. A new version of the Borobudur Crown was introduced during the press conference on the first day. Other activities, such as welcome dinner, Fashion Show Indonesia Berbasis Budaya (Indonesian Fashion Show With Culture; including evening gown, talent, and traditional costume competition), Jakarta Muslim Fashion Week, visit to the Corruption Eradication Commission and National Agency of Drug and Food Control's office, psychology test, deep interview, and rehearsal, were also carried out.

Selection committee 

There were nine selection committee members.
 Kusuma Dewi Sutanto – Head of Organization of Puteri Indonesia
 Mega Angkasa – Head of Communications of Puteri Indonesia
 Kusuma Ida Anjani – Director of PT Mustika Ratu
 Frederika Alexis Cull – Puteri Indonesia 2019 from Jakarta SCR 1 and Top 10 Miss Universe 2019
 Sireethorn Leearamwat – Miss International 2019 from Thailand
 Anya Geraldine – Actress
 Puan Maharani – Speaker of People's Representative Council
 Triawan Munaf – Chairman of Garuda Indonesia
 Budi Gunadi Sadikin – Minister of Health of Indonesia

Challenge events

Catwalk Challenge 

In this challenge, 45 contestants had to show off their catwalk skills through a short video.

#AskForHer Challenge 

In this challenge, 45 contestants were divided into nine groups and they had to answer some questions given by Yayasan Puteri Indonesia. The winner from each group competed again in the semifinal round, before went head-to-head in the grand final round.

Preliminary Round 
 Advanced to the semifinal round

Semifinal Round 
 Advanced to the grand final round

Grand Final Round

Personal Branding and Advocacy Challenge 

In this challenge, 45 contestants had to introduce themselves and promote their advocacy through a short video. The winners were invited to be speakers in EdHeroes Australia Forum 2022 on 30 April 2022.

Motion Challenge 

In this challenge, contestants were given a motion and they had to state whether they agree or not and elaborate it with their thoughts in 105 seconds. No winner was announced.

Contestants 
44 delegates competed for the title.

Notes

References

Puteri Indonesia
2022 in Indonesia
Beauty pageants in Indonesia